Subburaman Thirunavukkarasar (born 13 July 1949) is an Indian politician. He was the State President of Tamil Nadu Congress Committee till 2 February 2019 and former secretary of the All India Congress Committee (AICC) of the Indian National Congress (INC) party. His introduction to politics in 1977 was facilitated by former Chief Minister of Tamil Nadu, M. G. Ramachandran. Ramachandran founded the All India Anna Dravida Munnetra Kazhagam (AIADMK) in 1972 and was facing his first elections for the Tamil Nadu Legislative Assembly election in 1977. He identified Thirunavukkarasar, a lawyer by profession, to contest the Aranthangi assembly constituency. Thirunavukkarasar won the seat, aged 27, and was elected as the Deputy Speaker of the Tamil Nadu Legislative Assembly. He continued in that capacity till 1980. Subsequently, he served as Tamil Nadu state minister from 1980 to 1987 in the MGR cabinet, holding portfolios that included Industries, Housing Board, Excise and Handlooms. Later, he became a member of the Lok Sabha – the lower house of the Parliament of India – when he won the erstwhile Pudukottai Lok Sabha constituency. He served as Union Minister of state for shipping and later for telecommunications and information technology.

Thirunavukkarasar joined the Bharatiya Janata Party (BJP) for a brief period and was also a member of the Rajya Sabha – the  upper house of the Parliament of India – from the state of Madhya Pradesh. He is a Member of Parliament, representing Tiruchirappalli constituency in the Lok Sabha (the lower house of India's Parliament).

Early life
S. Thirunavukkarasar was born in Theeyathoor, Pudukkottai district, Tamil Nadu on 13 July 1949. He did his M.A., B.L. at Madras University, Chennai and Venkateshwara University, Tirupathi.

Career
Thirunavukkarasar was elected from Aranthangi legislative assembly constituency at each election from 1977 to 1996. He resigned his seat on 15 October 1999.,he started Anna Puratchi Thalaivar Thamilga Munnetra Kazhagam with K. K. S. S. R. Ramachandran in 1991, it merged with AIADMK in 1996.

He later started a new party called MGR Anna Dravida Munnetra Kazhagam in 1996 due to a rift with Jayalalitha, in the legislative assembly elections in Tamil Nadu 2001 MGR ADMK had put up three candidates (supported by NDA), out of whom two were elected. The party received 129 474 votes and in 2002 MGR ADMK merged with the Bharatiya Janata Party (BJP).He won the Pudukottai Lok Sabha Constituency in 1999 and was Union minister of state for Shipping and later,    Communication and Information Technology til 2004. 

He was appointed as the secretary of the AICC by the INC president, Sonia Gandhi. Currently, as AICC secretary, he is responsible for Telangana and participated in the selection of Jana Reddy as leader of the opposition. Thirunavukkarasar was invited to inaugurate the Tamil Nadu chapter of Indian National Congress Overseas in New York, US.

Achievements as State Minister (Tamil Nadu)
Thirunavukkarasar was the Industries, Handlooms and Commercial tax minister in the Ramachandran cabinet while simultaneously being the deputy speaker of the assembly. He established Tamil Nadu Magnesite Limited (TANMAG) and Tamil Nadu Minerals Limited (TAMIN) to further exploration of mineral resources in the state.  Thirunavukkarasar also established several State Industries Promotion Corporation of Tamil Nadu (SIPCOTs). Several paper and sugar mills were established by Thirunavukkarasar.

Believing in human resource development through education, he established schools, arts and science college and polytechnics in the 1980s. He also built small dams in rivers and started hospitals and primary health centers. These were done while there was hardly any awareness about water storage and health care.

Minister in the Government of India
As shipping minister, Thirunavukkarasar considered maritime education as necessary for the shipping industry. He emphasised the importance of technology and scientific training and encouraged the National Institute of Port Management to train more personnel. He also inaugurated new premises for Academy of Maritime Education and Training (AMET).

Congress relationship
When Sonia Gandhi took over the presidency of Congress Party in 1998. In the 1998 Lok Sabha elections, MGRADMK founded by Thirunavukkarasar alligined with the Congress to face the polls.

Thirunavukkarasar contested the Ramanathapuram Lok Sabha constituency when several congress stalwarts refused to contest the election. Recently in the year 2017 he was appointed as the State President of the Tamil Nadu Congress Committee and has in the past served as the secretary of the All India Congress Committee from 2010 to 2017.

Film career
Thirunavukkarasar briefly worked as film distributor. He scripted and produced the film Maruthu Pandi (1990) and appeared in lead role in Agni Paarvai (1992).
Maruthu Pandi (1990)
Agni Paarvai (1992)

Personal life
Su. Thirunavukkarasar married Jayanthi in 1978. They have three sons and two daughters.

References

3. http://www.outlookindia.com/printarticle.aspx?203657
4. http://expressindia.indianexpress.com/ie/daily/19980305/06450164.html
5. http://www.rediff.com/news/may/21aiadmk.htm
6. http://www.rediff.com/%0D%0Anews/1998/feb/20second.htm
7. http://indiatoday.intoday.in/story/sonia-gandhis-election-campaign-it-is-a-spectacle-from-start-to-end/1/263584.html
7. http://expressindia.indianexpress.com/ie/daily/19970606/15750193.html
8. http://indiatoday.intoday.in/story/while-mgr-recuperates-in-us-aiadmk-heads-for-a-split-jayalalitha-gets-a-rude-shock/1/353861.html

External links

 Profile on Rajya Sabha website

Living people
1949 births
Bharatiya Janata Party politicians from Tamil Nadu
All India Anna Dravida Munnetra Kazhagam politicians
Rajya Sabha members from Madhya Pradesh
Indian National Congress politicians from Tamil Nadu
India MPs 1999–2004
Lok Sabha members from Tamil Nadu
United Progressive Alliance candidates in the 2014 Indian general election
Deputy Speakers of the Tamil Nadu Legislative Assembly
Sri Venkateswara University alumni
People from Pudukkottai district
Tamil Nadu MLAs 1996–2001
United Progressive Alliance candidates in the 2019 Indian general election
India MPs 2019–present
Tamil Nadu MLAs 1991–1996
Tamil Nadu MLAs 1985–1989